Logging, agriculture, and the collection of wood for fuel are cited as leading causes of forest clearing in the West African country of Nigeria. Nigerians use firewood for cooking.

From 2000 to 2005, Nigeria had the highest rate of deforestation in the world at 55.7%, according to the Food and Agriculture Organization of the United Nations (FAO).

In the 1950s, large areas of land were reserved as protected areas, but they no longer exist, due in part to increasing demand for resources necessary for the country's growing population. Nigeria's biodiversity has been greatly impacted by environmental degradation and deforestation, as well as the encroachment on and the conversion of land for other uses.

The Global Forest Watch reported that 567,371 out of 10,048,732 hectares of forest had been lost to deforestation as of 2006. Between 2000 and 2005, the rate of forest change increased from 31.2% to 3.12% per annum. Nigeria lost 14% of its primary forest between 2002 and 2020. Forests are cleared for logging, timber export, subsistence agriculture and the collection of wood for fuel, which remains problematic in Western Africa. The rate of deforestation has increased due to a high demand for fuel wood, which is a source of energy for cooking as well as a major income source in rural areas. 

Deforestation has numerous adverse effects on the environment such as desertification, loss of ecosystem, loss of biodiversity, land degradation, and soil erosion. Deforestation threatens the sustainability of the environment and puts the economy and the citizens at risk.

A possible response to deforestation is to educate the society on the sustainable use of natural resources, forest management, improved technology, and alternative energy sources.

History 

Nigeria is highly endowed with ecological biodiversity. The nation is one of the richest biodiversity hotspots in the world. The country thrives particularly because of this aspect.

Before independence, massive forest reservations were put in place; about 96,518 square kilometers (km2) of land, representing 27% of the total forest cover, and 10% of the total land area, were reserved as  protected areas. Sixty-six percent of the forest reserves lie in the savanna region of the country, 20% fall within the humid tropical forest zones in the south, and 4% are freshwater swamps and mangroves of the coastal south.

When Nigeria gained independence in 1960 and became a sovereign state, it inherited eight national parks, 445 forest reserves, 12 strictly nature reserves,and 28 game reserves from the colonial administrators for the protection and conservation of the forest biodiversity in the country.

The vast areas reserved in the 1950s no longer exist. They have been greatly destroyed, and the protected areas have been deforested, degraded, encroached on, and converted to other land uses, as a result of the rapidly increasing population growth in the country.

The Nigerian Conservation Foundation (NCF) reported that in 2018 Nigeria had lost over 96% of its natural forest cover and its deforestation rate was 11.1% per annum. This has adversely affected forest biodiversity in the country.

In 2005, or 12.2% of Nigeria's original forest coverage area, had been deforested.

Impact

Deforestation is a process where vegetation is cut down without simultaneous replanting, for economic or social reasons. Deforestation has negative impacts on the environment in terms of soil erosion, loss of biodiversity ecosystems, loss of wildlife, land degradation, and increased desertification among many other negative impacts. Deforestation also has great impacts on agriculture, conflict, and most importantly, quality of life. According to the data for 2000 to 2005 in Nigeria, has the largest deforestation rates in the world, having lost 55.7% of its primary forests. Mongabay defines primary forests as forests with no visible signs of past or present human activities.

The annual rate of deforestation in Nigeria is 3.5%, approximately 350,000-400,000 hectares per year. The Food and Agriculture Organization of the United Nations lists the requirements of sustainable forest management as; extent of forest resources, biological diversity, forest health and vitality, productive functions of forest resources, protective functions of forest resources, socio-economic functions and a legal, policy and institutional framework. Many aspects of the outline are currently not being met and this will continue to have detrimental effects if not quickly addressed.

A lot of damage has been done to Nigeria's land through deforestation, which notably contributes to the overwhelming trend of desertification, the encroachment of desert on land which was once fertile. A study conducted from 1901 to 2005 found that there was a temperature increase in Nigeria of 1.1°C, while the global mean temperature increase was only 0.74°C. The same study also found that in the same period, the amount of rainfall in the country decreased by 81mm. It was obvious that both of these trends simultaneously had sharp changes in the 1970s.

From 1990 to 2010, Nigeria nearly halved its forest cover, from 17,234 to 9,041 hectares. The combination of extremely high deforestation, increased temperatures and decreasing rainfall have all contributed to the desertification of the country. The carbon emissions from deforestation are also said to account for 87% of the country's total carbon emissions.

Nigeria's wide biodiversity of 864 species of birds, 285 mammals, 203 reptiles, 117 amphibians, 775 fishes and 4,715 species of higher plants will also be strongly affected by the negative impacts of deforestation. The numbers of the rare Cross River gorilla have decreased to around 300 individuals because of poaching by locals and mass habitat destruction. Although much of the deforestation stems from economic reasons, it has also led to a lot of economic problems in an already unstable country. Deforestation has made the land incapable of its previous agricultural production, on which many people's livelihood and survival depend. 

Issues such as these and the subject of the environment itself have contributed to many conflicts and even executions of  environmental activists, such as Ken Saro-Wiwa, a Nobel Peace Prize nominee.

Much of the deforestation in Nigeria comes from the demand for fuel wood. 90% of the Nigerian population stated that they relied on kerosene as the main energy source for cooking but it is expensive and often unavailable, 60% said they used fuel wood instead. Use of fuel wood for cooking is higher in rural areas of the country where more of the population is concentrated. It is also a source of income to people living in rural areas surrounding the  deforested areas. The extremely high levels of poverty in the country are very much connected to the issue of deforestation.

Although national parks and reserves have increased in the country, only 3.6% of Nigeria is protected under IUCN categories I-V. The current state of the environment has been allowed by the Department of Forestry, which has not implemented any forest management policies to reduce deforestation since the 1970s. Without any conservation efforts or education, society is not aware of how to properly treat finite natural resources. Very few steps have been taken to lower the deforestation rate and to stop illegal logging.

Deforestation puts at risk all aspects of the environment, the economy and well-being of the citizens of the country.

Root causes in Nigeria 
Deforestation in Nigeria is a result of many factors, including climatic agents, logging, biotic agents and man. The activities of man like logging, agriculture, petroleum exploration, Urbanization, wood burning, grazing etc. are the most common causes of deforestation in Nigeria among other agents.

Agriculture 
The rapid growth in Nigeria's population has increased the demand for food. To meet this demand, large areas of forests are destroyed yearly either by bush burning or logging in a bid to create farmland. Also, farmers who practice shifting cultivation, slash and burn the bush, which is dangerous to the soil and to tropical rainforests as a whole. Some weeds and diseases have become threats to the plants in Nigeria's forests as a result of agricultural practices. For example, Eupatorium adoratum (Siam weeds) from south East Asia.

Petroleum exploration 
Petroleum exploration, oil spillage, and exploitation in the southern part of Nigeria have affected the swamp forest ecosystem in the region. These oil exploration activities have also affected the mangrove forests in the Niger Delta region of Nigeria. According to the department of petroleum resources, "about 419 oil spills have occurred on land, leading to the loss of between 5 to 10% of the mangrove forest."

Nigeria needs to stop the exploration of fossil fuels. And nobody or exploration company should stop looking for new oil, gas, or fuel reserves. With more exploration, we are going to have more floods, more desertification, higher temperatures, and high-water stress, and more land are going to be lost in Niger delta.

Wood burning 
According to the World Meteorological Organization, Nigeria is a leading producer of liquefied petroleum gas (LPG) and has a large reserve of natural gas. However, the high cost of cooking gas and kerosene has caused a majority of rural and semiurban households to resort to using wood for cooking. Over 120 million Nigerian rely on firewood and charcoal for their cooking needs, according to the International Energy Agency. Research by the World Wildlife Fund (WWF) estimates that wood used for cooking accounts for about half of the trees that are removed illegally from forests globally, with a majority coming from developing countries such as Nigeria.

Urbanization 
As a result of the high influx of people to urban areas, there has been the need for rapid development and provision of necessary social amenities like roads, airports, railways, bridges, schools, in these parts of the country which are now threats to the forests areas as trees and vegetations are cut down or burnt to achieve these development plans.

For instance, most first generation and second generation universities like University of Calabar were highly forested areas but the need to establish these schools made way for the destruction of these areas.

Most-affected areas of Nigeria 
From a study carried out between 2001 and 2020 by the Nigeria Deforestation rates & statistics, it was deduced that the five most affected states are Edo, Ondo, Cross River, Taraba, and Ogun states respectively. Edo state has sustained the highest forest loss of 268kha as to an average of 28.2kha. Other affected states in Nigeria include Delta, Kogi, Osun, Ekiti, and Oyo states respectively.

The demand for cocoa and palm oils in Cross River and Ondo State has led to environmental degradation.

Solution 
The following are ways to fight deforestation in Nigeria

 Adoption of alley cropping, planting of Timber trees, rehabilitation of mined areas with vegetation and planting of trees by private sectors.
 Enforcement of laws and regulations by government, practice of eco-forestry.
 Encouraging the use of stoves instead of firewood, harnessing the use of wind and solar as a source of energy.

Response

Possible response 
Any solution to the problem of deforestation in Nigeria must be an approach that incorporates and aggressively targets all aspects that are related to the problem. Teaching should include areas of energy alternatives, improved technology, forestry management, economic production, agriculture and security of the locals that are dependent on the land. Energy alternatives include hydropower, solar energy, and wind energy. Solar energy is a great option for Nigeria and will have exceptional results due to its geographical location. Nigeria has already implemented windmills in some of its states but the more this approach is taken on, the more energy that will be produced in an environmentally sound and efficient way. Each of these proposals is accepted globally as good alternatives to current energy production methods and have been encouraged by many environmental organizations. Improving the technology of cook stoves will be especially effective for Nigeria which currently has many households that require fuel wood for their cooking methods.

In 2005, a group of countries, called the Coalition for Rainforest Nations, developed a program to reduce the rates of deforestation that contribute to  emissions. The program is designed for all developing countries with a rainforest. The developing countries receive money upon successful completion of lowering their country's emissions. A similar concept has been designed by REDD, Reducing Emissions from Deforestation in and Forest Degradation in Developing Countries. In REDD, the countries are able to receive much more money in the form of carbon credits which can be spent on more environmentally safe practices.

In 2017, the federal government of Nigeria in conjunction with West Africa pledged to restore nearly 10 million acres of degraded land as part of a project of African Forest Landscape Restoration Initiative (AFR100) and Bonn challenge.

Also Kwara state government has made plan to plant 2.5 million trees to combat deforestation by 2047 in partnership with Nigeria Conservation Foundation (NCF). The Initiative has started with the planting of 15,000 seedlings in three communities: Latayi, Agboro and Koro in the Pategi area of the state.

The non-governmental organization Folliage (Fold for Liberal Age Charity Initiative) in partnership with Ondo State pledged to embark on planting of million trees across the state with the theme of "Plant a tree, Save a life".

In November of 2021, Nigeria was one of over a hundred nations whose world leaders that pledged to end deforestation by 2030 by raising $19.2 billion in order to halt and reverse loss of trees.

See also 
 Environmental issues in the Niger Delta
 Nigeria gully erosion crisis

References

Nigeria
Environmental issues in Nigeria
Forestry in Nigeria
Environmental disasters in Africa
Man-made disasters in Nigeria
Environmental justice